The unity of science is a thesis in philosophy of science that says that all the sciences form a unified whole. The variants of the thesis can be classified as ontological (giving a unified account of the structure of reality) and/or as epistemic/pragmatic (giving a unified account of how the activities and products of science work). There are also philosophers who emphasize the disunity of science, which does not necessarily imply that there could be no unity in some sense but does emphasize pluralism in the ontology and/or practice of science.

Early versions of the unity of science thesis can be found in ancient Greek philosophers such as Aristotle, and in the later history of Western philosophy. For example, in the first half of the 20th century the thesis was associated with the unity of science movement led by Otto Neurath, and in the second half of the century the thesis was advocated by Ludwig von Bertalanffy in "General System Theory: A New Approach to Unity of Science" (1951) and by Paul Oppenheim and Hilary Putnam in "Unity of Science as a Working Hypothesis" (1958). It has been opposed by Jerry Fodor in "Special Sciences (Or: The Disunity of Science as a Working Hypothesis)" (1974), by Paul Feyerabend in Against Method (1975) and later works, and by John Dupré in "The Disunity of Science" (1983) and The Disorder of Things: Metaphysical Foundations of the Disunity of Science (1993).

Jean Piaget suggested, in his 1918 book Recherche and later books, that the unity of science can be considered in terms of a circle of the sciences, where logic is the foundation for mathematics, which is the foundation for mechanics and physics, and physics is the foundation for chemistry, which is the foundation for biology, which is the foundation for sociology, the moral sciences, psychology, and the theory of knowledge, and the theory of knowledge is based on logic, completing the circle, without implying that any science could be reduced to any other.

See also

 Consilience
 International Encyclopedia of Unified Science
 Logical positivism
 Special sciences
 Stanford School
 Systems theory
 Tektology
 The central science
 Unified Science

Notes

References

  Bertallanfy's article was part of a section that also included, in response, Carl G. Hempel's "General system theory and the unity of science" (pp. 313–322), Robert E. Bass's "Unity of nature" (pp. 323–327), and Hans Jonas's "Comment on general system theory" (pp. 328–335).
 
 
 
 
 
 
 
 

Further reading

External links

Guide to the Unity of Science Movement Records 1934–1968 at the University of Chicago Special Collections Research Center

Science studies
Philosophy of science
Metaphysics of science

